Gerald Walter Johnson (July 10, 1919 – September 9, 2002) was a lieutenant general in the United States Air Force and a World War II flying ace. Enlisting in 1941, Johnson served as a fighter pilot in Europe, and was credited with shooting down 16.5 enemy aircraft before being shot down himself and taken prisoner. After the war, he continued his military career rising to command several fighter and bomber wings during the 1950s and 60s. He commanded the Eighth Air Force for a period during the Vietnam War, and retired in 1974 after serving as Inspector General of the Air Force.

Early life
Johnson was born in Owenton, a small town in northern Kentucky, on 10 July 1919.

He was a graduate of Boston University and did graduate work at George Washington University.

World War II

In 1941, he entered service with the United States Army Air Corps as an aviation cadet at Randolph Field, Texas.  He graduated the following April and was commissioned a second lieutenant.  He served with the 56th Fighter Group, flying Republic P-47 Thunderbolts in the European Theater of Operations (ETO).  He became the first ace of the 56th and the second American ace in the ETO.In February 1944, he was promoted to Major and took command of the 63d Fighter Squadron.  He was credited with 16.5 air-to-air victories.  After fifteen months of combat he was shot down on March 27, 1944, and spent 13 months as a prisoner of war at Stalag Luft I when it was liberated by The Red Army on May 2, 1945.

Strategic Air Command
After the war, he was associated with the fighter forces of Strategic Air Command (SAC), becoming the commander of the 508th Strategic Fighter Wing, flying Republic F-84 Thunderjets in 1954.  He remained in SAC after its fighters were transferred, becoming commander of the 4080th Strategic Reconnaissance Wing, the first USAF organization to fly the Lockheed U-2, in 1956. Following staff assignments with the 7th Air Division, SAC headquarters and the 12th Strategic Aerospace Division, he returned to command with the 95th Bombardment Wing in 1963.

In 1965, he became the commander of the 305th Bombardment Wing, which set a number of world speed records with the Convair B-58 Hustler during his command.  He then commanded the 825th Strategic Aerospace Division.  He became vice commander of Second Air Force in 1968 and commander of the 1st Strategic Aerospace Division in 1969.

After another staff tour with SAC headquarters, he became commander of the Eighth Air Force at Andersen Air Force Base, Guam, controlling all SAC bombers and tankers in the Pacific during the Vietnam War.  His final assignment was as Inspector General of the Air Force, retiring from that position on September 1, 1974.

Decorations

Military
 Command and General Staff School
 National War College

Aeronautical ratings
 Command pilot wings 
 Senior Missile Badge

References

Bibliography

External links

1919 births
2002 deaths
American prisoners of war in World War II
American World War II flying aces
Aviators from Kentucky
People from Owen County, Kentucky
United States Air Force personnel of the Vietnam War
Recipients of the Distinguished Service Cross (United States)
Recipients of the Legion of Merit
Recipients of the Distinguished Flying Cross (United States)
Recipients of the Air Medal
Shot-down aviators
United States Air Force generals
United States Army Air Forces pilots of World War II
World War II prisoners of war held by Germany